Xerxes Desai was the first managing director of Titan Company, an Indian watchmaking company, and played an instrumental role in laying the foundation of the company.

Biography 
Desai was a graduate of Elphinstone College (Mumbai University) and Oxford University.

Desai joined Tata Administrative Services in 1961 after graduation, working at several of their companies. He founded Titan as a joint venture with  J. R. D. Tata in 1986, with support from the Tamil Nadu Industrial Development Corporation. He had suggested the idea of a watchmaking company to Tata in the 1970s, who liked it, but bureaucratic hassles took time till the company was opened in 1986 in Hosur.

In 1994, Desai challenged engineers at Titan to design the world's thinnest watch, with a movement 1.15mm thick inside a 3.5mm case. The watch, called the Titan Edge was introduced in 2002.

After Titan's success, Desai founded Tanishq, a jewelry brand. He had innovative ideas like asking people in Bangalore to get their jewelry appraised in 1999. The jewelry business grew over time, after a slow start.

Desai retired in 2002, and was succeeded by his protégé Bhaskar Bhat.

Post retirement 
Desai was awarded a Lifetime Achievement award by the National Institute of Design during its 4th Design Excellence Awards in 2006.

Post retirement, Desai was a part of the Indian Institute for Human Settlements (IIHS) initiative by Nandan Nilekani.

Death 
Desai died from illness in Bangalore, where he had lived for 30 years, on 27 June 2016, at the age of 79.

References 

2016 deaths
Alumni of the University of Oxford
Parsi people
Tata Group people
Watchmakers (people)
1937 births
Titan Company